The 2015 Mexican League season was the 91st season in the history of the Mexican League. It was contested by 16 teams, evenly divided in North and South zones. The season started on 3 April and ended on 14 September with the last game of the Serie del Rey, where Tigres de Quintana Roo defeated Acereros de Monclova to win the championship.

This season marked the Mexican League's 90th anniversary. To celebrate it, the league presented a commemorative logo and slogan: 90 años, historia imparable (90 years, unstoppable story).

Standings

Postseason

League leaders

Managerial changes

Offseason

In season

Awards

References

Mexican League season
Mexican League season
Mexican League seasons